George Coote may refer to:

 George Cotes (died 1556), or Coote, English academic and bishop
 George Gibson Coote (1880–1959), Canadian accountant, bank manager, farmer, and federal politician